Edman is a surname. Notable people with the surname include:

Erik Edman, (born 1978), Swedish footballer
Göran Edman (born 1956), Swedish vocalist
Irwin Edman (1896–1954), American philosopher and professor of philosophy
Jens Edman (born 1976), Swedish auto racing driver
Johan Edman (1875–1927), Swedish tug of war competitor who competed in the 1912 Summer Olympics
Jonas Edman (born 1967), Swedish rifle shooter, specializing in the Prone position
Niclas Edman (born 1991), Swedish ice hockey player
Pehr Victor Edman (1916–1977), Swedish biochemist
Phil Edman (born 1970), Australian politician
Tommy Edman (born 1995), American baseball player
Tore Edman (1904–1995), Swedish ski jumper who competed in the 1920s
Brayden Edman (2002-present), Notable Catholic

See also
Edman degradation, developed by Pehr Edman, is a method of sequencing amino acids in a peptide